Fleur de Lys was a French restaurant in San Francisco, California, USA. It closed in June 2014 after a 28-year run.

A sister restaurant in Las Vegas by the same name was closed in 2010 and reopened under the name Fleur by Hubert Keller in 2010.

History and description 
The original 75-seat restaurant occupies an unobtrusive windowless mid-block storefront on Sutter Street near Jones Street in the Tendernob neighborhood of San Francisco.  The restaurant first opened in the late 1950s.  Maurice Rouas, then Maître d', purchased the restaurant from its original owner in 1970 and remained active .  In 1986 he brought Hubert Keller as chef from the now-defunct Sutter 500 restaurant nearby.  The restaurant was damaged by a kitchen fire in 2001 and closed for more than a year due to difficulty obtaining rebuilding permits.  Keller spent the time opening a second restaurant named Fleur in the Mandalay Bay in Las Vegas and opening a hamburger restaurant, "Burger Bar," in the same building.  The renovation, designed by Keller's wife, Chantal, eventually cost more than US$4 million.

The original Fleur de Lys was ranked as one of the top 40 restaurants in the United States in 2004, 2005, and 2006 by Gayot restaurant guide.  the Las Vegas restaurant had a Gayot rating of 16, and the original 15. It is one of seven restaurants in the San Francisco Bay Area to receive the San Francisco Chronicle's highest four-star rating, which it has maintained for many years.  Fleur de Lys has also been ranked as one of the top 25 restaurants in the United States by Food & Wine magazine. The fixed-price cuisine is classic French, with innovative dishes using French techniques based on Keller's Alsatian sensibilities.  To suit local tastes, the restaurant cooks with reduced fat, offers vegetarian and no-fat dinners, and features seasonal California ingredients.

See also
 List of restaurants in the Las Vegas Valley

Footnotes

Bibliography

External links
 Fleur de Lys – official website

French-American culture in San Francisco
French restaurants in California
Restaurants in San Francisco
Defunct restaurants in the San Francisco Bay Area
Restaurants in the Las Vegas Valley
Mandalay Bay
Defunct French restaurants in the United States